Knavesmire Secondary School was a secondary modern school based in York, England from the 1960s (c. 1965) to the 1980s. During the 1960s it was a girls only school. The building was located on Bishopthorpe Road next to York Racecourse, and was taken over by the  College of Law in the early 1990s.  The University of Law (to which the business of the College of Law was transferred, effectively little more than a name change with the removal of charitable status) moved its north-east campus to Leeds in the 2010s and sold the campus.  The school is now occupied by OneSchool Global, an independent school connected to the Plymouth Brethren evalangelical church. The author Sheelagh Kelly attended the school during the 1960s.

References

Defunct schools in York